The ISRA Academy (Islamic Sciences and Research Academy) is an Islamic educational institute based in Sydney, Australia with a strong online presence. The organisation is closely affiliated with the Charles Sturt University which provides joint study programs for students of Islamic studies. The institute was founded to meet the educational needs of Australian Muslims as well as to foster greater understanding of Islam by the greater Australian public.

Founding
The organisation was jointly founded by Affinity Intercultural Foundation and Charles Sturt University.

ISRA Academy was launched both nationally in Canberra in November, 2009, and locally in Sydney, at the historic Sydney’s Customs House, in March, 2010.

Personnel and faculty
The president of ISRA Academy is Mehmet Ozalp.

See also
Islam in Australia
Islamic organisations in Australia

References

External links
ISRA website

Islamic organisations based in Australia
Islamic studies
Australian tertiary institutions
Organisations based in Sydney